The Garda National Protective Services Bureau (GNPSB) is a specialist unit of the Garda Síochána in Ireland that handles human trafficking, child protection, domestic violence and sexual violence and general support to victims in distress. Established in 2015, GNSPB is commanded by a Detective Chief Superintendent.

The bureau houses the following units:

Domestic Abuse Intervention Unit
Domestic Homicide Review Team 
Sex Offender Management & Intelligence Unit
Sex Offender Risk & Assessment Management Unit
Violent Crime Linkage Analyses System Unit 
Missing Persons Unit
Sex Offender Liaison
GNPSB Intelligence Office
National Victims Liaison Office
Victims of Crime Related Matters
Human Trafficking Investigation & Co-Ordination Unit
Sexual Crime Management Unit
On-Line Child Exploitation Unit
Child Protection

References

Garda Síochána units